William J. Weatherby (1930–1992) was a British–American author and journalist who was actively involved in the American Civil rights movement. His works span numerous literary genres, including mystery, romance, historical fiction, biography, and journalism.

Life and career 
Born in a suburb of Manchester, England in 1930, Weatherby first travelled to the United States in the late 1950s as an entertainment correspondent and feature writer for The Guardian before being assigned to report on the Civil Rights Movement in the early 1960s. While covering the movement, he began a relationship with an African American man named Christine, and the couple travelled together throughout Louisiana, Georgia, and New York. His experience covering the movement, along with his relationship with Christine, inspired the novel Love in the Shadows (1965), though when fictionalizing his experiences, Weatherby wrote Christine as a woman for the story to be published.

Throughout the 1960s, Weatherby was actively involved in the Civil Rights Movement and developed close friendships with Civil Rights leaders James Baldwin and Bayard Rustin. During this time, he also served as the American editor for Penguin Books.

In the 1970s, he worked as a senior editor at the publishing company Farrar, Straus & Giroux, and in 1976, he published Conversations with Marilyn, an account of his discussions and experiences with Marilyn Monroe during the filming of what would be her final completed movie, The Misfits (1961); Weatherby had briefly acted as a confidante of Monroe's during his time as an entertainment reporter in the early 1960s.

Weatherby published a number of other books regarding the lives of influential people, including a 1989 biography of his close friend, James Baldwin. Others of his works include the mystery stories Murder at the UN (1977) and Death of an Informer (1977), as well as the novel One of Our Priests is Missing (1968). Weatherby was also the co-editor of The Negro in New York: An Informal Social History (1967), a research project conducted under the Works Progress Administration, along with Roi Ottley, and wrote articles Newsweek, the Washington Post, and The New York Times, as well as the activist publishing house New Society.

In August 1992, Weatherby died of cancer at Saint Francis Hospital in Poughkeepsie, New York. He was 62 years old.

Bibliography

Novels 

 Love in the Shadows (1965)
 One of Our Priests is Missing (1968)
 Murder at the UN (1977)
 Death of an Informer (1977)

Non-fiction 

 The Negro in New York: An Informal Social History (1967; co-editor with Roi Ottley)
 Conversations with Marilyn (1976)
 James Baldwin, Artist on Fire (1989)
 Salmon Rushdie, Sentenced to Death (1990)
 Jackie Gleason (1992)

References

Gay writers
20th-century American non-fiction writers
20th-century American novelists
Civil rights activists
1930 births
1972 deaths
British emigrants to the United States